The 2006 Spar European Cup (the 27th) took place in Málaga, Spain and attracted over 2000 athletes from 49 countries. The mascot for the 2006 games was "Manolito" the Octopus, it was chosen from the drawings submitted in a contest aimed at Andalusian schoolchildren, the winner was Eva Simancas Rubio, aged 11 from ‘Julio Caro Baroja’. The top two teams for both men and women qualified for the 2006 IAAF World Cup.

Super League

Stadium
The Athletics Stadium Ciudad de Málaga is located in the city's western area, and is easily accessible by road, not far from the airport and in front of the 'José María Martín Carpena' Sports Hall. It also has 9 lanes on the track which allows a 9th team to be able to compete.

Team standings

Results summary

Men's events

Women's events

First League
The First League was held on 17 and 18 June

Men

Group A
Held in Prague, Czech Republic

Group B
Held in Thessaloniki, Greece

Women

Group A
Held in Prague, Czech Republic

Group B
Held in Thessaloniki, Greece

Second League
The Second League was held on 17 and 18 June

Men

Group A
Held in Banská Bystrica, Slovakia

Group B
Held in Novi Sad, Serbia and Montenegro

Women

Group A
Held in Banská Bystrica, Slovakia

Group B
Held in Novi Sad, Serbia and Montenegro

External links
Final Standings
European Cup results (Men) from GBR Athletics
European Cup results (Women) from GBR Athletics

Sport in Málaga
European Cup
European Cup (athletics)
International athletics competitions hosted by Spain
2006 in Spanish sport